General elections will be held in Cambodia on 23 July 2023 to elect members of the National Assembly. It will be the seventh quinquennial election in Cambodia since democratic elections were restored in 1993. The Cambodian People's Party (CPP) currently holds all seats in parliament. Prime minister Hun Sen will seek another five-year term in office.

Background
Hun Sen has been Prime Minister of Cambodia and its predecessor states (the People's Republic of Kampuchea and the State of Cambodia) since January 1985 (in acting capacity from December 1984 until then). Since the 1997 coup d'état, he has consolidated power, resulting in authoritarian rule culminating in the establishment of a de facto one-party system in 2018 after the Supreme Court of Cambodia that was loyal to him banned the largest opposition party, the Cambodia National Rescue Party led by Sam Rainsy and Kem Sokha.

Hun Sen was endorsed as the CPP's prime ministerial candidate for the 2023 election during the party's 43rd Congress. The Central Committee also unanimously approved Hun Manet, Hun Sen's son, as the party's future prime ministerial candidate after Hun Sen. Hun Sen has publicly vowed to stay on until after the 2028 election, though a transition of power to his son between 2023 and 2028 has not been entirely ruled out. Despite some shortcomings, particularly during the large-scale outbreak in early 2021, the government was widely praised for its COVID-19 response, having overseen a successful vaccination program, with over 80% of the population fully vaccinated, as of January 2022.

A high-profile public spat between the Kem Sokha and Sam Rainsy factions of the former Cambodia National Rescue Party (CNRP) meant there is unlikely to be united opposition against the CPP. The 2022 communal elections, which resulted in an expected landslide for the CPP, was seen as a bellwether for the general election. Based on those results, the CPP internally projected that it would win 104 seats or 83.20%, and the Candlelight Party would win 21 seats or 16.80%. But after wards the spokesperson for CPP Sok Eysan said now CPP will be targeting 90% of seats or 120 seats.

Arrests

Khem Sokha 
Former Cambodia National Rescue Party (CNRP) President Khem Sokha was sentenced to 27 years in jail for allegedly conspiring with foreign powers to topple the government. He was detained at his home in Phnom Penh's Tuol Kork neighborhood and is being held at Trapeang Phlong jail awaiting trial. Because to Covid-19 concerns, his first trial was postponed. On March 3, 2023, the municipal court condemned him to 27 years in prison under Criminal Code sections 439 and 443, and excluded him from politics and elections under Article 450. Sokha was not immediately imprisoned, but was instead restricted to his house under court monitoring.  After the court verdict, condemnation was shown by human rights groups and the US embassy and UN Human Rights Commissioner.

Resignation

Cambodian Youth Party 
After 15 party members including three senior members of the Cambodian Youth Party including Neou Bora, Huon Thearith and Chhom Chanthorn, whom were members of the standing committee. Party Leader Pich Sros said, "The resignations of senior officials are not thing to worry about, and the party plans to register its participation and list of candidates with the NEC [For the 2023 Election].

Candlelight Party 
Kong Korm, a senior advisor to Cambodia's Candlelight Party, resigned after authorities announced plans to pursue a lawsuit against him for comments he made in January condemning the seizure of his property. He apologized to Hun Sen and the CPP for forcing the party to file a lawsuit and said his association with the Candlelight Party had been a mistake, in the letter Kong Korm said, "I accepted my mistakes and apologized to the CPP president who deemed my latest political activities caused harm to CPP leaders’ dignity and disturbed society harmony.”

Hun Sen Government

Foreign Policy 
During the Russo-Ukrainian War, Hun Sen and the government of Cambodia, kept a neutral stance. Tho establishing bigger ties with Ukraine, where Hun Sen and Foreign Minister Prak Sokhonn met with Ukrainian Foreign Minister Dmytro Kuleba and sent "Deminers" to train Ukrainian Soldiers  and where Ukraine also showed plans of opening on Embassy in Phnom Penh. Both Sides including Russia and Ukraine had praised the Cambodian Government of maintaining it's neutrality on the conflict

Dismissals 
A Royal Decree, signed by King Norodom Sihamoni, removed Minister of Agriculture, Forestry and Fisheries Veng Sakhon from his position on October 8th 2022, with immediate effect. The decision was made at the request of Prime Minister Hun Sen. The government then designated Minister of Economy and Finance Aun Pornmonirath as acting minister of agriculture in addition to his current ministry and duties. In which later wards the National Assembly approved Dith Tina as the new Minister of Agriculture. 

On 24th of August 2022, The Governor of Takhmao City was sacked from his post and reassigned to work in the Kandal Provincial Administration due to his "inactiveness" in dealing with clean water for residents.

Governor Changes

Pursat 
On the 21st of November 2022, Khoy Rida was swooned into office as the provincial governor of Pursat by Interior Minister Sar Kheng, due to the last governor Cheav Tay having been transferred due to his deteriorating health.

Mount Kulen Gathering 
Khem Veasna issued an ultimatum to the huge gathering assembled at a farm house south of Kulen Mountain, who flocked to the home after hearing a "doomsday warning" from a local politician and believed the region to be a "safehaven". People have assembled at the location in response to a forecast made by a local politician, Khem Veasna, president of the League for Democracy Party, that they need to do so in order to "survive a devastating flood in the country and world" (LDP). Authorities gave the ultimatum after observing the crowd grow from 15,000 to 20,000 people.

Governmental Reaction

Provincial Officials 
Teng Channat, the head of the provincial police in Siem Reap, warned that if Khem Veasna doesn't help dissolve the group by 30 August as he promised, the government will file a lawsuit.

District Governor of Banteay Srei District in Siem Reap Province, Khim Finan, reported that since Saturday, officials had insisted that the gathering disband. Have speaking with the press, he added, “We are waiting to see whether the groups will disband since I’ve noticed that more people are gathering in and around his farm and also along the road to Kulen Mountain rather than leaving, which is really upsetting to witness”.

Siem Reap Provincial Governor Tea Seiha visited Khem Veasna’s farm and asked him to disband the crowd.

Nationwide Officials 
Hun Manet along with other officials also had went down to the farm home where the event was taking place and requested Khme Veasna to disband the gatherings.

The property, which is roughly an hour's drive from Siem Reap, is being evacuated by army trucks and ambulances under orders from Prime Minister Hun Sen. According to Mr. Hun Sen, the authorities should make it simple for the people to leave the gathering and return home if they so choose.Hun Sen claimed that Khem Veasa, the League for Democracy Party's president who recently converted to religion and dubbed himself a Brahma, or celestial king, was pressuring him to use violence to disperse the rally and arrest him.“However, I advised the authorities not to fall into his trap; not to do anything. I will not use violence against him.”, Hun Sen had also added, “Veasna cursed me harshly on Facebook, but I am not going to respond with anger. I’ll find a peaceful solution for the sake of all people in the Kingdom, he is free to make any claim he wishes, his political career will be over once his supporters discover that he has been lying,” the Prime Minister added.

Electoral system
The Constitution of Cambodia states the National Assembly are elected 5 year terms from 25 multi-member constituencies based on the provinces by closed list proportional representation. Seats were allocated using the D'Hondt method and elections are to happen on the fourth Sunday of July.The number of seat allocation of provinces:

Voters 
All citizens aged 18 and older are eligible to vote. Voting is not mandatory. The NEC had fielded 9,710,645 registered voters for the 2023 Cambodia, a rise of 504,964 more voters since the 2022 Communal Elections and a rise of 13.7% (1,330,428) voters since the 2018 General Elections. 

Demographics 

Growth Trend of Registered Voters since 1993

Election schedule

Communal by-elections 
A sub-decree signed by Prime Minister Hun Sen on 5 January stipulated the number of separate and newly formed city council members in Kandal, Kampong Speu and Kratie for the first mandate. The sub-decree added that for Arey Ksat city in Kandal, there are 19 councillors. Separately, Sampov Poun city in Kandal must have 19 councillors as well. The sub-decree added that for Udong Mechey in Kampong Speu, there must be 17 councillors. Samakki Monichey district, located in Kampong Speu, must have 19 councillors. The sub-decree also stated that for the newly established O’Kreang Sen Chey district in Kratie, must have 15 councillors.

Timeline of The By-Elections:

Contesting parties

References 

Elections in Cambodia
Cambodia
General